Limblifter is a Canadian alternative rock group from Vancouver, formed in 1996.

History
The group was originally formed by brothers Ryan Dahle and Kurt Dahle, as a side project from their main band, Age of Electric, along with a third member, Ian Somers. Their self-titled 1996 album, recorded after a mere 10 practices, spawned the Canadian rock radio hits "Tinfoil", "Vicious" and "Screweditup", but the band was hindered by staff alterations at their label Mercury Records. The group went on hiatus when Age of Electric regrouped for their 1997 album Make a Pest a Pet.

When AOE subsequently broke up, Limblifter became the Dahles' primary band. On April 2, 1998, Somers announced he was leaving the band. Todd Fancey joined the band as their new bassist. In 2000, the band released their second album, Bellaclava. Although that release wasn't as successful commercially as Limblifter, the singles "Ariel vs. Lotus" and "Wake Up to the Sun" were popular on radio.

Kurt Dahle and Todd Fancey subsequently left the band in 2001 to concentrate on The New Pornographers. In 2002, Ryan Dahle formed the band "Alarm Bell" with guitarist David Patterson, ex-Matthew Good Band drummer Ian Browne and Matthew Camirand. Camirand later left Alarm Bell and was replaced by Megan Bradfield. In 2004, Dahle, Patterson, Bradfield, and new drummer Brent Follett revived Limblifter. The band released the album I/O in 2004.

Bradfield, Steward and Dahle have all gone on to work with Matthew Good, with Steward becoming Good's new drummer for his subsequent solo career after his band, the Matthew Good Band, became defunct.

The band's fourth album, Pacific Milk, was released on April 7, 2015 and their fifth album, Little Payne, was released on October 31, 2022.

Discography

Albums
 Limblifter (1996, 2012 remaster)
 Bellaclava (2000, 2020 remaster)
 I/O (2004)
 Pacific Milk (2015)
 Little Payne (2022)

Singles

Music videos
 Perfect Day To Disappear (2005)
 Wake Up To The Sun
 Cordova
 Vicious
 On The Moon
 Ariel Vs Lotus
 Tinfoil

References

External links
 Limblifter Official Site
 Limblifter at Maple Music
  About Limblifter

Musical groups established in 1996
Musical groups from Vancouver
Canadian alternative rock groups
1996 establishments in British Columbia